"The Rag Trade" was the theme song to the 1977 revival of The Rag Trade, a British TV comedy made by the London Weekend Television (LWT) production company for ITV. The song was written by Lynsey de Paul, but the vocals are credited to Joan Brown singing "It's the rag trade" over a quirky tune, sounding remarkably like de Paul. Indeed, some sources credit the vocal performance of the song to de Paul. The recording was arranged by John Bell and the conductor was Denis King. It was released on an album of TV themes on the DJM Records subsidiary label Weekend Records. The DVD set featuring all 22 episodes of the LWT episodes, with the theme music at the beginning and ending of every episode, was released by Network. The original version of "The Rag Trade" can be heard on de Paul's official website.

References

1977 songs
Songs written by Lynsey de Paul
Comedy television theme songs